Darband-e Olya may refer to:
 Darband-e Olya, Dargaz
 Darband-e Olya, Sarakhs